The Patriots is a 1994 French film by director Éric Rochant which focuses on certain activities carried out by the Mossad, as well as describing some of their operational tactics. It is a fictionalized account of two separate missions undertaken by the Israeli secret services. The first part relates the acquisition of the plans of the nuclear power plant which was later bombed by the Israeli Air Force (the Osirak nuclear site in Iraq). The second part of the movie is an interpretation of the Jonathan Pollard spy scandal.

The film was entered into the 1994 Cannes Film Festival.

Cast
 Richard Masur - Jeremy Pelman
 Yvan Attal - Ariel Brenner
 Allen Garfield - Eagleman
 Yossi Banai - Yossi
 Nancy Allen - Catherine Pelman
 Maurice Bénichou - Yuri
 Emmanuelle Devos - Rachel
 Hippolyte Girardot - Daniel
 Moshe Ivgy - Oron
 Sandrine Kiberlain - Marie-Claude
 Bernard Le Coq - Bill Haydon
 Christine Pascal - Laurence
 Jean-François Stévenin - Remy Prieur
 Éva Darlan - Madame Prieur
 Dan Toren - Ran Ostrovitch
 Myriem Roussel - Laurence's friend

References

External links 

1990s French-language films
1994 films
1990s spy thriller films
French spy thriller films
1990s political thriller films
Films directed by Éric Rochant
Films about the Mossad
French political thriller films
1990s French films